The Höchhand (1,314 m) is a mountain of the Appenzell Alps, located north of Goldingen in the canton of St. Gallen.

References

External links
Höchhand on Hikr

Mountains of the Alps
Mountains of the canton of St. Gallen
Appenzell Alps
Mountains of Switzerland